Aphaena is a genus of planthoppers in the sub-family Aphaeninae of Fulgoridae. Species are distributed from eastern India, Indo-China, China and Malesia.

Species
Fulgoromorpha Lists on the Web lists: 
subgenus Aphaena
 Aphaena amorifera Schmidt, 1924
 Aphaena aurantia (Hope, 1840)
 Aphaena chionaema Butler, 1882
 Aphaena decolora (Chou & Wang, 1984)
 Aphaena discolor Guérin-Méneville, 1834 - type species
 Aphaena dissimilis Distant, 1906
 Aphaena murei Nagai & Porion, 1996
 Aphaena najas Schmidt, 1906
 Aphaena satrapa Gerstaecker, 1895
 Aphaena submaculata (Duncan, 1843)
 A. submaculata burmanica Distant, 1906
 A. submaculata consanguinea (Distant, 1906) (synonym Aphaena relata)
 A. submaculata resima (Stål, 1855)
subgenus Callidepsa
 Aphaena amabilis (Hope, 1843)
 Aphaena cornuta (Fabricius, 1803)
 Aphaena hainanensis Wang, 1995
Extinct species
 †Aphaena atava Scudder, 1877
 †Aphaena lithoecia Zhang, 1989

Gallery

References

External links

Auchenorrhyncha genera
Aphaeninae